Anthony Cumia (born )  is an American radio personality, podcaster and broadcaster. He is the host of The Anthony Cumia Show on the online video platform Compound Media, which he founded. He is best known as the co-host, with Gregg "Opie" Hughes, of the Opie and Anthony radio show, which aired from 1995 to 2014, with the show featuring comedian Jim Norton beginning in 2001.

In 2014, Cumia was fired by SiriusXM Radio after posting a series of angry tweets, claiming to have been assaulted by a black woman. He started his own video podcast soon after named The Anthony Cumia Show, which aired until September 2017, when he started The Artie and Anthony Show with comedian and actor Artie Lange. In May 2018, Lange left the show and was replaced by Dave Landau; the show's name reverted to The Anthony Cumia Show.

Early life
Cumia was born in Flushing, Queens, into an Italian-American family. He has an elder brother, Joe, and a younger sister, Dawn. The family lived in various locations on Long Island including Elwood and East Islip. Cumia attended Timber Point Elementary School in East Islip, followed by Elwood-John H. Glenn High School in Elwood. One of his teachers was actress Joyce MacKenzie. After his parents separated, Cumia spent his early teenage years living with his father in San Juan Capistrano, California.

Before he started his radio career, Cumia  installed heating, ventilation, and air conditioning systems. He wanted to get into radio, and was influenced by popular New York City personalities Howard Stern and Don Imus.

Career

Opie and Anthony (1994–2014)

Cumia first met radio personality Gregg "Opie" Hughes when the latter held an O. J. Simpson song parody contest on his Nighttime Attitude show on Long Island radio station WBAB. He and Joe decided to enter the contest, and recorded an entry as Rotgut titled "Gonna Electric Shock OJ" to the tune of "(Sittin' On) The Dock of the Bay" by Otis Redding. The song was a hit with Hughes, who played it several times on his show and, in September 1994, invited the Cumias to the studio to perform the song live. Cumia began to contribute and produce comedy bits for Hughes and the station's morning show soon after, while working his installation job. By early 1995, Hughes and Cumia decided to become the hosts of their own radio show, and Hughes produced an air check and sent it to several stations.

Hughes and Cumia accepted an offer to host afternoons at WAAF in Boston, Massachusetts, and launched Opie and Anthony in March 1995. Cumia originally thought that by getting into radio he would make very good money, but later said his salary at WAAF was barely higher than doing manual labour. The pair were fired in April 1998 for an April Fool's Day prank that had listeners believe Boston Mayor Thomas Menino was killed in a car accident while transporting a young female Haitian prostitute. Cumia referred to their days on WAAF as the most cringe-inducing moments of his career.

In June 1998, Opie and Anthony began at WNEW in New York City in afternoons, becoming a top 10 afternoon drive show in two years. Around 2000, Hughes considered leaving the show but Cumia convinced him to stay as Infinity Broadcasting promised them a more lucrative contract and have the show nationally syndicated. The show developed further when comedian Jim Norton joined the show as their co-host in 2001. By mid-2002, Opie and Anthony was syndicated on 17 stations nationwide. On August 22, 2002, Opie and Anthony was cancelled over their "Sex for Sam 3" segment five days earlier that involved a Virginia couple having simulated sex in St. Patrick's Cathedral. Infinity kept Hughes and Cumia from being hired for the duration of their contract which expired in mid-2004.

On October 4, 2004, the show returned to the air on XM Satellite Radio, a subscription-based satellite radio service. From April 2006 to March 2009, part of the show was simulcast on nine terrestrial radio stations owned by CBS Radio that was compliant to the broadcast regulations imposed by the Federal Communications Commission. During this time, XM suspended the show for thirty days on May 15, 2007, after a homeless man dubbed "Homeless Charlie" expressed his wish to rape Condoleezza Rice and Laura Bush.

On July 3, 2014, Cumia was fired by SiriusXM for a series of tweets against a black woman who allegedly assaulted him which were described by the company as "racially-charged and hate-filled". His firing came after Cumia stated that he was repeatedly punched by a black woman as he was taking pictures in Times Square. In the following week, Cumia refused to apologize for the incident. He deleted the tweets after being fired.

Live from the Compound (2012–2014)
During his time at SiriusXM, Cumia gradually built a studio in his home to broadcast. In 2012, he launched Live from the Compound via Ustream that he started as a hobby and involved discussions on a variety of matters and "drunk karaoke". Cumia retired the program in 2014.

Compound Media and The Anthony Cumia Show (2014–present)

In the week after his firing from SiriusXM in July 2014, Cumia announced the launch of The Anthony Cumia Show. Initially he was "petrified" about the show's success and lacked the confidence to turn the project into a full-time job, but hired people to help get the show running in one month. The show launched on August 4, 2014, through his subscription-based network Compound Media, which was initially known as The Anthony Cumia Network, from Monday through Thursday from 4–6 pm. In June 2015, Cumia expanded the network with new shows added to the weekly schedule. In August 2015, Cumia relocated his show to a studio in New York City to better suit guests and the new hosts.

On August 21, 2017, Cumia announced the addition of comedian and actor Artie Lange as the co-host of his new show, The Artie and Anthony Show. The show launched on September 5 and continued on the same schedule as The Anthony Cumia Show. The show lasted eight months and ended with Lange's departure on May 14, 2018. One week prior to Lange's departure, the show had added comedian Dave Landau as a permanent third mic. With Lange leaving the show, Landau took over as co-host and the show title switched to The Anthony Cumia Show with Dave Landau.

On November 20, 2018, Post Hill Press released Cumia's book, titled Permanently Suspended: The Rise and Fall... and Rise Again of Radio's Most Notorious Shock Jock. It features a foreword by Jim Norton.

In February 2021, Dave Landau left The Anthony Cumia Show with Dave Landau to join Louder with Crowder on Blaze Media, with the show's name reverting to The Anthony Cumia Show.

On March 31, 2021, Cumia launched a second show titled Compound Censored,  which he co-hosts with Vice Media co-founder and comedic commentator Gavin McInnes. The show's title is a portmanteau which combines Compound Media with McInnes' subscription-based network Censored.TV, where the show also broadcasts.

Other ventures

XFL Gameday
Along with Opie, Cumia co-hosted XFL Gameday, a pregame show for Vince McMahon's startup football league, for four weeks in February 2001. The half-hour show was produced by NBC's owned and operated stations and shown on Channel 4 in New York. The show was taped on Wednesdays at the WWF's "World" restaurant in Times Square, and was open to the public. It featured analysis by WNBC sportscaster Bruce Beck and New York/New Jersey Hitmen head coach Rusty Tillman, but also featured plenty of raunch. One segment featured Opie and Anthony as chefs, inserting a cucumber between two melons.

After the show's cancellation four weeks into the season, XFL creator Vince McMahon stated that he'd had no creative control over the show, further elaborating, "I heard it was horrible. Had I seen it, I would have shut it down."

Demented World

Opie, along with Anthony released a compilation of segments from their show that aired on WAAF on a CD entitled Demented World in November 1997.

Opie and Anthony's Traveling Virus Comedy Tour

The Traveling Virus was a comedy tour headlined by Opie and Anthony, as well as friends of the show, that performed in various cities during 2006, 2007, and 2008.

Search and Destroy
On the morning of March 26, 2008, Opie & Anthony revealed they had taped a pilot for Comedy Central. The show was titled Search & Destroy and it featured teams of comedians performing various tasks throughout New York City. Opie and Anthony believe that it may have been too graphic even for cable television. Comedy Central did not pick the show up.

Personal life
In 1987, Cumia met the future Jennifer Cumia who was dating his brother, Joseph, at the time. Anthony began dating her in 1989 after she broke up with Joe, and the two married after seven months. In March 2002, they finalized their divorce. Cumia later stated that marrying Jennifer was the biggest mistake of his life. He then dated a woman he met on the show, Melissa, better known as "Lobster Girl," which became the source of online taunts against him, as he confirmed on their show. After they parted ways, he dated Jill Nicolini in 2008,, and then model Melissa Stetten in 2012.

On December 19, 2015, Cumia was in an argument at his house with his girlfriend Danielle Brand, the daughter of Stress Factory owner Vinnie Brand, which turned violent. He was arrested by Nassau County police on charges of strangulation, assault, criminal mischief, and unlawful imprisonment. Cumia was released without bail on December 21, at which time his attorney stated that Cumia denied the allegations. In June 2016 Cumia pled guilty to third-degree assault and criminal obstruction of breathing in a plea deal. As a condition of the deal, if Cumia completed six months of outpatient alcohol rehab and participated in a program designed for batterers, the original charges to which he pled guilty would be dropped and reduced to harassment, which would not leave Cumia with a record. Cumia later admitted on his show to biting Brand's hand because he "was pissed" and "out of [his] mind". Cumia spent April 2016 in a rehabilitation facility in the Tampa Bay area in Florida. He said that although his decision to enter rehab was related to the December 2015 incident, it was not court-ordered.

Cumia is a supporter of the National Rifle Association and has had a carry permit for New York City.

In 2006, Cumia bought a home in Roslyn Heights, New York, for $2.9 million. In 2020, he put the home up for sale with the intention to move to a southern state that more closely aligns with his views. Cumia eventually bought a property in South Carolina, which is now his primary residence.

References

Further reading

External links

Compound Media

1960s births
Living people
People from Flushing, Queens
People from Huntington, New York
People from East Islip, New York
Radio personalities from New York City
American podcasters
American talk radio hosts
Shock jocks
American people of Italian descent
20th-century American people
21st-century American people
Date of birth missing (living people)
Year of birth missing (living people)